Øyvind Storesund (born 9 March 1975 in Bø i Telemark, Norway) is a Norwegian Rock and jazz musician (upright bass) known from playing in the Norwegian bands Cloroform and Kaizers Orchestra.

Career 
Storesund replaced the former bassist Jon Sjøen in the band Kaizers Orchestra, and is also a driving force on the free-jazz Avant-Garde scene, playing with Paal Nilssen-Love, Pauline Oliveros and Frode Gjerstad releasing the album This Is Not Sweden (2007), together with Peter Brötzmann.

Discography 

With The Silver Voices
1997: Songs We Love So Dear (Lynor Records)

With Cloroform
1998: Deconstruction (KAAARec)
1999: Do The Crawl (Bergland Production)
1999: All – Scars (KAAARec)
2003: Hey You Let's Kiss (KAAARec)
2005: Cracked Wide Open (KAAARec)

With Frode Gjerstad & the Circulasione Totale Orchestra
1998: Borealis (Cadence Jazz Records)

With Wunderkammer
1999: Wunderkammer (Plateselskapet Skarv)
2002: Today I Cannot Hear Music (HoneyMilk Records)

With Frode Gjerstad Trio
2001: The Blessing Light: For John Stevens (Cadence Jazz Records)
2002: Last First (Falçata-Galia, Transparency)
2003: St. Louis (FMR Records)
2003: Sharp Knives Cut Deeper (Splasc(h) Records), with Peter Brötzmann
2006: Mothers & Fathers & (Circulasione Totale)
2006: Nothing Is Forever (Circulasione Totale)

With Kaada
2001: Thank You For Giving Me Your Valuable Time (EMI Records)
2004: MECD (Warner Music, Norway)
2004: Natural Born Star (KAAARec), Music From The Motion Picture

With Kaada/Patton
2004: Romances (Ipecac Recordings)
2007: Live (Ipecac Recordings)

With Kaizers Orchestra
2005: Maestro (Kaizerecords)
2011: Live i Oslo Spektrum (Petroleum Records, Monster)
2013: En Aften I Operaen (Petroleum Records, Monster)

With Boschamaz
2007: This Is Not Sweden (Hecca Records)

Film music 
With Kaada music from the Motion Picture
2007: Natural Born Star (KAAARec) 
2008: O' Horten (KAAARec)

References

External links

Cloroform 
Kaizers Orchestra 
Open Form 

1974 births
Living people
 Musicians
Bø i Telemark
Jazz double-bassists
Norwegian jazz upright-bassists
Male double-bassists
Rock double-bassists
21st-century double-bassists
21st-century Norwegian male musicians
Male jazz musicians